Trichromia perversa is a moth of the family Erebidae. It was described by Walter Rothschild in 1909. It is found in the Brazilian state of Amazonas, French Guiana, Suriname and Panama.

References

 

perversa
Moths described in 1909